John Sullivan may refer to:

Activists
John Earle Sullivan, Insurgence USA organizer arrested following the 2021 Capitol riot
William John Sullivan (born 1976), usually known as John Sullivan, free software activist

Clergy
John Sullivan (Jesuit) (1861–1933), Irish priest whose canonization cause has been proceeding
John Joseph Sullivan (bishop) (1920–2001), American clergyman of the Roman Catholic Church

Entertainers
John Sullivan (writer) (1946–2011), English screenwriter for sitcoms including Only Fools and Horses, Citizen Smith and Just Good Friends
Fred Allen (John Florence Sullivan), American radio comedian
John Jeremiah Sullivan (born 1974), American writer and editor
John L. Sullivan (elephant) (c. 1860–1932), boxing elephant of the Adam Forepaugh Circus

Mathematicians
John M. Sullivan (mathematician) (born 1963), American mathematician
John W. Sullivan, mathematician and member of the Palliser Expedition

Politicians
John Sullivan (Australian politician) (born 1929), Australian politician
John Sullivan (colonial administrator) (1788–1855), district collector of Coimbatore, southern India
John Sullivan (MP) (1749–1839), British politician and Privy Counsellor, MP for Old Sarum
John A. Sullivan (Oklahoma politician) (born 1965), United States Representative from Oklahoma
John Alexander Sullivan (1879–1952), Conservative member of the Canadian House of Commons
John Andrew Sullivan (1868–1927), United States Representative from Massachusetts
John Augustus Sullivan (1798–1871), Jamaican politician
John B. Sullivan (1897–1951), United States Representative from Missouri
John J. Sullivan (diplomat) (born 1959), United States Ambassador to Russia, former Deputy Secretary of State and Deputy Secretary of Commerce
John J. Sullivan (Massachusetts politician), running mate of independent Massachusetts gubernatorial candidate Christy Mihos
John L. Sullivan (Arizona politician), Arizona Attorney General, 1935–1937 and 1944–1948
John L. Sullivan (United States Navy) (1899–1982), United States Secretary of the Navy
John Leo Sullivan, Secretary of State for the U.S. state of Missouri, 1917–1921
John M. Sullivan (politician) (born 1959), Illinois state senator
John P. Sullivan (politician) (1843–1899), merchant and politician in Prince Edward Island, Canada

Soldiers
John Sullivan (American sailor) (1839–1913), American Civil War sailor and Medal of Honor recipient
John Sullivan (general) (1740–1795), United States general and delegate to the Continental Congress, Governor of New Hampshire and federal judge
John Sullivan (VC) (1830–1884), Irish sailor who won the Victoria Cross
John P. Sullivan (general), United States Army general

Sportsmen

Baseball
John Sullivan (1900s catcher) (1873–1924), MLB catcher from 1905 to 1908
John Sullivan (outfielder) (1890–1966), MLB outfielder from 1920 to 1921
John Sullivan (pitcher) (1894–1958), MLB pitcher in the 1919 season
John Sullivan (shortstop) (1920–2007), MLB shortstop from 1942 to 1949
John Sullivan (1960s catcher) (born 1941), MLB catcher from 1963 to 1968

Cricket
John Sullivan (Lancashire cricketer) (1945–2006), English cricketer
John Sullivan (Gloucestershire cricketer) (born 1948), English cricketer

Association football
John Sullivan (English footballer) (born 1988), English goalkeeper with Portsmouth F.C.
John Sullivan (Irish footballer) (born 1991), Irish midfielder with Drogheda United F.C.

Gridiron football
John Sullivan (Canadian football) (born 1981), Canadian football player
John Sullivan (center) (born 1985), American football player
John Sullivan (kicker) (born 1985), American football player
John Sullivan (defensive back) (born 1961), American football defensive back
John Sullivan (American football coach) (1938–2010), American football player and coach

Other sports
John Sullivan (shot putter), silver medalist in the shot put at the 2000 African Championships in Athletics
John Sullivan (tennis) (born 1966), American tennis player
John L. Sullivan (1858–1918), Irish-American boxer and first heavyweight boxing champion
John L. Sullivan (wrestler) (born 1946), professional wrestler better known as Johnny Valiant
John F. Sullivan (1935–2010), player in the American Basketball League

Other people
John C. Sullivan (died 1830), surveyor who established the eastern border of Indian Territory
John Joseph Sullivan (judge) (1855–1926), Chief Justice of the Nebraska Supreme Court
John Sullivan (1793–1867), member of the Stephens-Townsend-Murphy Party, the first wagon train to cross the Sierra Nevadas into California
John P. Sullivan (USN), author of Volume I of the Dictionary of American Naval Fighting Ships

Characters
John L. Sullivan, lead character in Preston Sturges's Sullivan's Travels, played by Joel McCrea
John Sullivan, lead character in Frequency, played by Jim Caviezel
John "Sully" Sullivan, character in Third Watch, played by Skipp Sudduth
John Sullivan, character in 40 Days and 40 Nights
John Sullivan, character in Around the World in Eighty Days
John Sullivan, lead character in "Something Was Wrong" from More Scary Stories to Tell in The Dark

See also
Jon Sullivan (1950–2021), Australian politician
Jack Sullivan (disambiguation)
John O'Sullivan (disambiguation)